Edgard José Scandurra Pereira (born 5 February 1962) is a Brazilian singer, composer, guitar player, drummer and musical director, who is a member of the Brazilian rock band Ira!.

Before joining Ira!, Edgard was a member of Ultraje a Rigor. He has also made several guest appearances with other Brazilian bands and artists such as Kid Abelha, Vange Milliet, Os Paralamas do Sucesso, Vespas Mandarinas, Lobão and Guilherme Arantes.

References

1962 births
Living people
Brazilian drummers
Brazilian guitarists
Brazilian male guitarists